Gary Curtis Davis (born September 7, 1954) is a former American football running back in the National Football League (NFL). He was drafted by the Miami Dolphins in the sixth round of the 1976 NFL Draft and also played for the Tampa Bay Buccaneers and Cleveland Browns. He played college football at Cal Poly-San Luis Obispo.

College career 
At Cal Poly, Davis led the California Collegiate Athletic Association in rushing yardage as a junior and senior, and was selected for All-CCAA accolades twice. He majored in social sciences. In his final season of 1975, Davis also was chosen for United Press International 'Little All-Coast Team' status.

Professional career 
Davis ranks third all-time in Miami Dolphins history for single-season kickoff return average, averaging 29.6 yards per return in 1977.

In August 2022, Sports Illustrated ranked Davis as the third-greatest Dolphin to ever wear jersey number 27.

References

External links
Cal Poly Mustangs bio

1954 births
Living people
Players of American football from Los Angeles
American football running backs
American football return specialists
Cal Poly Mustangs football players
Miami Dolphins players
Tampa Bay Buccaneers players
Cleveland Browns players